is a private university at Ibaraki, Osaka, Japan, founded in 1966. (Otemon Gakuin was founded in 1888. It has its origins in the elementary school attached to Osaka Kaikosha, whose foundation was proposed by Tomonosuke Takashima.)

Alumni 
Teru Miyamoto
Takashi Otsuka
Kunihiko Muroi
Juri Tatsumi
Hidesawa Sudo

External links
 Official website 
 Official website 

 

Educational institutions established in 1966
Private universities and colleges in Japan
Universities and colleges in Osaka Prefecture
1966 establishments in Japan
Kansai Collegiate American Football League